Octomeria palmyrabellae is a species of orchid endemic to Brazil (São Paulo to Paraná).

References

External links 

palmyrabellae
Endemic orchids of Brazil
Orchids of Paraná (state)
Orchids of São Paulo (state)